Rai Bahadur Ganga Saran was a Hindu trade unionist from Punjab.

In the 1946 Punjab Provincial Assembly election, Saran won as an independent candidate from a non-constituency seat reserved for Punjab Trade and Labour Unions. He was a member of the National Liberal Federation of India. Saran intended to stay in Pakistan after Pakistan, and became a member of the Provincial Assembly of West Punjab. On 4 July 1947, he was elected by the non-Muslim members of the West Punjab section of the (yet-undivided) Punjab Assembly to the Constituent Assembly of Pakistan.

A couple of months later, Saran migrated to India and on 1 November 1947, became a member of East Punjab Legislative Assembly. Despite, he did not resign from the Constituent Assembly of Pakistan. In January 1949, the "Committee on Addition and/or Redistribution of Seats", while recommending the dissolution of the two vacant non-Muslim seats in the Assembly, hinted that it was constitutionally suspect whether Saran was entitled to retain his seat. 

In 1951, Saran supported Bhim Sen Sachar in a factional feud against then-Chief-Minister Gopi Chand Bhargava.

Notes

References 

Trade unionists from Punjab, India
Members of the Constituent Assembly of India
Members of the Constituent Assembly of Pakistan
Members of the Provincial Assembly of the Punjab